The Comeback EP is an EP by the Canadian indie rock band Stars, released in 2001 on Le Grand Magistery Records.

Track listing

References

2001 EPs
Stars (Canadian band) albums